Frank Whitney Ward (September 23, 1904 – February 14, 1980) was an American basketball player who is best known for playing on the dominant teams of Montana State in the late 1920s. Ward, a  center, played for coach G. Ott Romney, a man credited with implementing the fast break style of play in basketball. Montana State won three conference championships during Ward's tenure, and in 1928–29 they finished the season with a 35–2 record. They were declared national champions by the Helms Athletic Foundation. Ward was a two-time NCAA All-American, including a consensus selection in 1930.

Following his college career, Ward coached high school basketball in Montana. He died on February 14, 1980, in Sheridan, Wyoming.

References

1904 births
1980 deaths
All-American college men's basketball players
American men's basketball players
Basketball players from Utah
Centers (basketball)
High school basketball coaches in Montana
Montana State Bobcats men's basketball players